Leslie Fuhri (born 22 October 1965) is a South African cricketer. He played in seventeen first-class matches from 1986/87 to 1995/96.

References

External links
 

1965 births
Living people
South African cricketers
Border cricketers
KwaZulu-Natal cricketers
Cricketers from Pietermaritzburg